The 49th Field Artillery Battalion was a battalion of the Field Artillery Branch of the United States Army.

Lineage
Constituted 1 October 1933 in the Regular Army as the 49th Field Artillery.
Redesignated as the 49th Field Artillery Battalion, assigned to the 7th Infantry Division, and activated at Fort Ord, California 1 June 1941.
Inactivated 20 July 1947 at Seoul, Korea.
Activated 20 March 1949 at Jimmachi, Honshu, Japan. (49th Coast Artillery Battalion consolidated with the 49th Field Artillery Battalion 28 June 1950).
Relieved from the 7th Infantry Division and inactivated in Korea 1 July 1957
Consolidated with the 44th Field Artillery, 7 November 1969.

Coat of arms
 Shield
Per Chevron enhanced gules and argent, on the last a bear's head erased and incensed proper.
 Crest
None
 Background
The scarlet is the Field Artillery, The silver of the shield in conjunction with the scarlet is indicative of the preparedness of the battalion night and day. The firing functions are allegorically illustrated by the incensed bear's head, being representative of the state of activation, California, taken from the crest of that state.

Campaign streamers
World War I
 St. Mihiel
 Alsace 1918
 Lorraine 1918
World War II
 Aleutian Islands (with arrowhead)
 Northern Solomons
 Eastern Mandates
 Leyte
 Ryukyus (with arrowhead)
Korean War
 UN defense
 UN offensive
 CCF intervention
 First UN counteroffensive
 CCF Spring offensive
 UN summer-fall offensive
 Second Korean winter
 Korea summer-fall 1952
 Third Korean winter
 Korea summer 1953

Decorations
 Philippine Presidential Unit Citation, Streamer embroidered 17 OCTOBER 1944 TO 4 JULY 1945
 Republic of Korea Presidential Unit Citation, Streamer embroidered INCHON
 Republic of Korea Presidential Unit Citation, Streamer embroidered KOREA

References

  lineage

External links
 http://www.history.army.mil/html/forcestruc/lineages/branches/av/default.htm
 http://www.coretek.org/gsmith/promotions.html

049
Military units and formations established in 1933
Military units and formations disestablished in 1969